Melby can refer to the following:

People
Bob Melby (born 1928), an American optometrist and former politician in the state of Florida
Ernest O. Melby (1891–1987), a professor, dean, and university president
Gaute Melby Gundersen (born 1972), a retired Norwegian athlete who specialised in the sprint hurdles
Guri Melby (born 1981), a Norwegian politician for the Liberal Party
James C. Melby (1949–2007), a wrestling historian
John Melby (born 1941), a composer from the United States
John F. Melby (1913–1992), a diplomat from the United States

Places
Melby, Halsnæs Municipality, a village in Halsnæs municipality in the Capital Region of Denmark
Melby Windmill, a smock mill located at Melby in Halsnæs Municipality, Denmark
Melby, Funen, a village in Funen, Denmark
Melby, Shetland, a village in the Shetland islands in Scotland
Melby, Norway, a village in the municipality of Skaun in Trøndelag county, Norway
Melby, Minnesota, an unincorporated community in the United States

See also
Melbury (disambiguation)
Medelby
Mejlby
Melmerby (disambiguation)